Burns and Allen were an American comedy duo consisting of George Burns and his wife, Gracie Allen. They worked together as a successful comedy team that entertained vaudeville, film, radio, and television audiences for over forty years.

The duo met in 1922 and married in 1926. Burns played the straight man and Allen played a silly, addle-headed woman whose convoluted logic Burns was often ill-equipped to challenge. The duo starred in a number of films, including Lambchops (1929), The Big Broadcast (1932) and two sequels in 1935 and 1936, and A Damsel in Distress (1937). Their 30-minute radio show debuted in September 1934 as The Adventures of Gracie, whose title changed to The Burns and Allen Show in 1936; the series ran, moving back and forth between NBC and CBS, until May 1950. After their radio show's cancellation, Burns and Allen reemerged on television with a popular situation comedy, which ran from 1950 to 1958.

Burns and Allen's radio show was inducted into the National Radio Hall of Fame in 1994. Their TV series received a total of 11 Primetime Emmy Award nominations and produced what TV Guide ranked No. 56 on its 1997 list of the 100 greatest episodes of all time. They were inducted into the Television Hall of Fame in 1988.

Vaudeville

Burns and Allen met in 1922 and first performed together at the Hill Street Theatre in Newark, New Jersey, continued in small town vaudeville theaters, married in Cleveland on January 7, 1926, and moved up a notch when they signed with the Keith-Albee-Orpheum circuit in 1927.

Burns wrote most of the material and played the straight man. Allen played a silly, addle-headed woman, a role often attributed to the "Dumb Dora" stereotype common in early 20th-century vaudeville comedy. Early on, the team had played the opposite roles until they noticed that the audience was laughing at Gracie's straight lines, so they made the change. In later years, each attributed their success to the other.

The Burns and Allen team was not an overnight sensation. "We were a good man-and-woman act," Burns said, "but we were not headliners or stars or featured attractions. We were on the bill with them. There would be a star or two stars and a featured attraction, and then we would come—fourth billing in an eight-act show." Their career changed direction when they made their first film.

Motion pictures
In the early days of talking pictures, the studios eagerly hired actors who knew how to deliver dialogue or songs. The most prolific of these studios was Warner Bros., whose Vitaphone Varieties shorts captured vaudeville headliners of the 1920s on film.

Burns and Allen earned a reputation as a reliable "disappointment act" (someone who could fill in for a sick or otherwise absent performer on a moment's notice). So it went with their film debut. They were last-minute replacements for another act (Fred Allen) and ran through their patter-and-song routine in Lambchops (1929). After a restoration, the film was released on DVD in October 2007, on disc three of a three-disc 80th anniversary edition of The Jazz Singer.

Paramount Pictures used its East Coast studio to film New York-based stage and vaudeville stars. Eddie Cantor, Fred Allen, Ethel Merman and Smith and Dale were among the top acts seen in Paramount shorts. Burns and Allen joined the Paramount roster in 1930 and made a string of one-reel comedies through 1933, usually written by Burns and featuring future Hollywood character actors such as Barton MacLane and Chester Clute.

In 1932, Paramount produced an all-star musical comedy, The Big Broadcast, featuring the nation's hottest radio personalities. Burns and Allen were recruited, and made such an impression that they continued to make guest appearances in Paramount features through 1937. Most of these used the Big Broadcast formula of an all-star comedy cast. In 1935 the team also starred in a pair of low-budget features, Here Comes Cookie and Love in Bloom.

At RKO, Fred Astaire succeeded in his efforts to make a musical feature without Ginger Rogers, and the studio borrowed Burns and Allen from Paramount for the 1937 film, A Damsel in Distress. Their names appeared with Astaire's before the title. Under contract to RKO, the young Joan Fontaine was assigned as Astaire's romantic interest, but when she proved to be an inadequate dance partner Astaire did most of his dancing with Burns and Allen. The trio's comic dance in the film's "Fun House" sequence earned an Academy Award for choreographer Hermes Pan. Burns suggested a dance number that employs whiskbrooms as props, used in vaudeville by a duo called Evans and Evans. He bought the idea and auditioned the routine for Astaire, with Allen and the surviving member of the vaudeville team.

This movie led Metro-Goldwyn-Mayer to cast Burns and Allen in its Eleanor Powell musical, Honolulu (1939). This was their last film as a team; Gracie made two subsequent film appearances on her own, but Burns and Allen did not return to the cameras until their television series in 1950.

When Burns was 79, he had a sudden career revival as an amiable, beloved and unusually active comedy elder statesman in the 1975 film The Sunshine Boys, for which he won the Academy Award for Best Supporting Actor. In 1977, his starring role in Oh, God!, along with the former film, permanently secured his career resurgence. At the age of 80, Burns was the oldest Oscar winner in the history of the Academy Awards, a record that would remain until Jessica Tandy won an Oscar for Driving Miss Daisy in 1989.  Burns, who became a centenarian in 1996, continued to work until just weeks before his death of cardiac arrest on March 19, 1996, at his home in Beverly Hills.

Filmography

Radio

In 1929 Burns and Allen made their debut radio performance broadcast in London on the BBC. In the United States, they had failed at a 1930 NBC audition. After a solo appearance by Gracie on Eddie Cantor's radio show, they were heard together on Rudy Vallee's The Fleischmann's Yeast Hour and on February 15, 1932, they became regulars on The Guy Lombardo Show on CBS. When Lombardo switched to NBC, Burns and Allen took over his CBS spot with The Adventures of Gracie beginning September 19, 1934.

Along the way, the duo launched the temporary running gag that made them near-irrevocable radio stars: the famous hunt for Gracie's "lost brother," which began on January 4, 1933 and eventually became a cross-network phenomenon. Gracie was also liable to turn up on other shows (especially those produced by the J. Walter Thompson advertising agency, which produced the Burns & Allen series) looking for her brother. Bad publicity after a bid by NBC to squelch the stunt—and an accidental mention by Rudy Vallee on his Fleischmann's Hour—helped the stunt continue, according to radio historian John Dunning's On the Air: The Encyclopedia of Old-Time Radio, which also mentioned that Gracie's real brother, a "publicity-shy accountant" living in San Francisco, went into hiding until the gag ran its course.

Burns and Allen followed this with another stunt: "Gracie Allen for President." During the election year of 1940, Gracie represented the fictitious Surprise Party and advocated nonsense as part of her platform. The "campaign" was successful enough for Gracie to actually receive write-in votes on election day.

The title of their top-rated show changed to The George Burns and Gracie Allen Show on September 26, 1936. One successful episode, "Grandpa's 92nd Birthday," aired July 8, 1940. In 1941 they moved from comedy patter into a successful sitcom format, continuing with shows on NBC and CBS until May 17, 1950. As in the early days of radio, the sponsor's name became the show title, such as Maxwell House Coffee Time (1945–49).

The show featured several regulars on radio, including Toby Reed, Gale Gordon, Bea Benaderet, Gracie's real-life friend Mary "Bubbles" Kelly, Ray Noble, singers Jimmy Cash and Tony Martin and actor/writer/director Elliott Lewis. The Sportsmen Quartet (appearing as "The Swantet" during the years the show was sponsored by Swan Soap) supplied songs and occasionally backed up Cash. Meredith Willson, Artie Shaw and announcers Bill Goodwin and Harry Von Zell were usually made a part of the evening's doings, often as additional comic foils for the duo.

For a long time they continued their "flirtation act" with Burns as Allen's most persistent suitor. Their real-life marriage was not written into the show until 1941, when Burns noticed that their ratings were slowly but steadily slipping. He realized that he and Gracie "were too old for our jokes," and revised the format to include husband-and-wife characters in a situation-comedy setting. Burns' assessment was correct, and the Burns and Allen program went on to achieve new heights.

Recordings of 176 episodes of the radio shows circulate on the web, CDs and DVDs—including all installments of the "Gracie for President" routine and some of the "lost brother" episodes.

Broadcast history

Accolades
The Burns and Allen Show was inducted into the National Radio Hall of Fame in 1994.

Television
 

In 1950, Burns and Allen transitioned to television with The George Burns and Gracie Allen Show. An immediate success, the half-hour situation comedy was broadcast October 12, 1950 – September 22, 1958, on CBS. The show was initially staged live in New York and presented every other week. In the fall of 1952 it became a weekly series filmed on the West Coast. With 291 episodes, the show had a long network run through 1958 and continued in syndicated reruns for years.

The sets were designed to look like the couple's real-life residence. An establishing shot of the actual house on Maple Drive in Beverly Hills, California, was often used. Although extensively remodeled, that house still exists today—including the study over the garage where George would "escape" from Gracie's illogical logic. Burns lived in the house until his death in 1996, at the age of 100.

The format had George watching all the action (standing outside the proscenium arch in early live episodes; watching the show on TV in his study towards the end of the series) and breaking the fourth wall by commenting upon it to the viewers.

During the course of the eight-year run, the TV show had remarkable consistency in its cast and crew.  The episodes were produced and directed by Ralph Levy (1950–53); Frederick de Cordova, later director of NBC's The Tonight Show Starring Johnny Carson (1953–56); and Rod Amateau (1956–58). The original writing staff consisted of Sid Dorfman, Harvey Helm, Paul Henning and William Burns (George's brother). The TV show was produced under the banner of McCadden Productions, a company run by George Burns which he named after the street on which his brother, William, lived. The McCadden catalog is owned by Sony Pictures Television.

Bea Benaderet carried over from the radio show, portraying neighbor Blanche Morton. Her husband Harry Morton was first portrayed by Hal March (October–December 1950), and then by John Brown (January–June 1951), and after that, Fred Clark, until 1953 when the role was assumed by Larry Keating.

Also appearing in the TV series were Burns and Allen's two adopted children, Ronnie and Sandra. Ronnie became a near-regular on the show, playing himself but cast as a young drama student who tended to look askance at his parents' comedy style. Sandra declined becoming a regular member of the cast, although she appeared in a few episodes, usually as a secretary or the voice of a telephone operator.

In March 1953, The George Burns and Gracie Allen Show joined I Love Lucy as part of the CBS Monday night prime-time lineup. As a result, the show entered the top 30 television programs in the Nielsen ratings ranking at No. 20. For the 1954–1955 season, it ranked No. 26, and for both the 1955–56 and 1956–57 seasons it was No. 28. With I Love Lucy ending its six-year run on CBS in the spring of 1957, the television network wanted to renew the Burns and Allen series, but by this time Allen had grown tired of the grind. Nevertheless, Burns committed both of them for another year, which would be their eighth—and last—on television.

Allen announced her retirement on February 17, 1958, effective at the end of the current season.

Burns and Allen filmed their last show June 4, 1958. The filming was an emotional experience, although nothing was said about it being Allen's last performance. At the wrap party, Allen took a token sip of champagne from a paper cup, hugged her friend and co-star Bea Benaderet, and said "Okay, that's it." After one last look around the set, she said, "And thank you very much, everyone."

"She deserved a rest," Burns said when Allen devoted herself to gardening and being a housewife:

She had been working all her life, and her lines were the toughest in the world to do. They didn't make sense, so she had to memorize every word. It took a real actress. Every spare moment—in bed, under the hair dryer—had to be spent in learning lines. Do you wonder that she's happy to be rid of it?

Burns attempted to continue the show with the same supporting cast but without Allen. The George Burns Show lasted one season (October 21, 1958 – April 14, 1959) on NBC.

Following a mild heart attack in the 1950s, Gracie Allen suffered a series of angina episodes over a number of years. She had a major heart attack in 1961. She lived a slower but comfortable retirement for another three years, often appearing in public with her husband but never performing. Gracie Allen died August 27, 1964.

Accolades
The George Burns and Gracie Allen Show received a total of 11 Primetime Emmy Award nominations.

In 1997, the 1954 episode,  "Columbia Pictures Doing Burns and Allen Story", was ranked No. 56 on TV Guide's 100 Greatest Episodes of All-Time.

McCadden Productions
The George Burns and Gracie Allen Show was produced under the banner of McCadden Productions, a company run by George Burns which he named after the street on which his brother William lived. While the series was in production Burns began producing other television shows and commercials. McCadden Productions employed more than 300 people and produced series including Mister Ed, The Bob Cummings Show, The People's Choice, The Marie Wilson Show and Panic.

"Television was still so new that nobody really knew what kinds of shows the audience would watch," Burns wrote, "but I figured that people would like the same things on television that they liked in vaudeville, so we did shows with pretty girls and animals."

Legacy
Known for his philanthropy, George Burns made numerous contributions to the Cedars-Sinai Medical Center in Los Angeles. The hospital is located at the intersection of George Burns Road, dedicated in 1986, and Gracie Allen Drive, dedicated in 1995. The George Burns–Gracie Allen Chair in Cardiology was established in 1989. The Burns and Allen Research Institute was dedicated in 1996, on Burns' 100th birthday.

Sources and further reading

References

External links

Radio
 Zoot Radio, free 'Burns and Allen' old time radio show downloads, 160 episodes
Television
 

1930s American radio programs
1940s American radio programs
1950s American radio programs
American comedy duos
American comedy radio programs
Married couples
Paramount Pictures contract players
American film series
Television series by U.M. & M. TV Corporation
CBS Radio programs
NBC radio programs
George Burns
Gracie Allen
Columbia Records artists